Pseudancistrus is a genus of suckermouth armored catfishes native to South America.

Taxonomy
Pseudancistrus is a genus in the tribe Ancistrini of the subfamily Hypostominae. It was described by Pieter Bleeker in 1862, and redescribed by Jonathan Armbruster in 2004. Currently, there are 18 recognized species distributed in northern South America, with the inclusion of the genera Lithoxancistrus, the species formerly known as Hemiancistrus megacephalus, as well as the recently described Pseudancistrus corantijniensis. There is no single morphological feature which distinguishes the group from related genera. Despite this, Pseudancistrus is generally recognized as a monophyletic group.

Within the genus there is what is called the P. barbatus group. This group comprises Guyanese derived Pseudancistrus bearing hypertrophied odontodes along the snout and nonevertible cheek plates. It includes the five species P. barbatus, P. corantijniensis, P. depressus, P. nigrescens, and P. zawadzkii.

Species
There are currently 18 recognized species in this genus:
 Pseudancistrus asurini G. S. C. Silva, Roxo & C. de Oliveira, 2015 
 Pseudancistrus barbatus (Valenciennes, 1840) (Bearded catfish)
 Pseudancistrus coquenani (Steindachner, 1915)
 Pseudancistrus corantijniensis de Chambrier & Montoya-Burgos, 2008 
 Pseudancistrus depressus (Günther, 1868)
 Pseudancistrus genisetiger (Fowler, 1941)
 Pseudancistrus guentheri (Regan, 1904)
 Pseudancistrus kayabi G. S. C. Silva, Roxo & C. de Oliveira, 2015 
 Pseudancistrus kwinti Willink, Mol & Chernoff, 2010 
 ‘Pseudancistrus’ megacephalus (Günther, 1868)
 Pseudancistrus nigrescens C. H. Eigenmann, 1912
 Pseudancistrus orinoco (Isbrücker, Nijssen & Cala, 1988)
 Pseudancistrus papariae Fowler, 1941
 Pseudancistrus pectegenitor Lujan, Armbruster & Sabaj Pérez, 2007 
 Pseudancistrus reus Armbruster & Taphorn, 2008 
 Pseudancistrus sidereus Armbruster, 2004
 Pseudancistrus yekuana Lujan, Armbruster & Sabaj Pérez, 2007 
 Pseudancistrus zawadzkii G. S. C. Silva, Roxo, Britzke & C. de Oliveira, 2014

Distribution and habitat
Pseudancistrus species are found around the Guiana Shield in the Guyanas, Venezuela, and Brazil. They are also found in northeastern Brazil in the Rio Jaguaribe and Rio Grande do Norte. They are associated with swift flowing water over gravel, cobble, and boulders.

Description
There is a considerable variation in size within this genus, up to over 20 cm in standard length, in the case of species such as P. pectegenitor. Most species are not able to evert their cheek plates. In some species, odontodes on the snout may sometimes be extremely hypertrophied. Most species are dark gray, with lighter colouration on the abdomen. In some species, there are light-colored spots or blotches on the sides. Usually, the fins are similarly colored, but in some species there are bands on the caudal fin or an orange or red edging to the dorsal fin and caudal fin.

References

Ancistrini
Fish of South America
Fish of Brazil
Fish of Venezuela
Catfish genera
Taxa named by Pieter Bleeker
Freshwater fish genera